Merwin D. "Jimmy" Maier (August 14, 1908 – February 15, 1942) was an American attorney and bridge player from New York City. He was a member of the Four Aces from 1937 until his death from an unknown virus in New York in 1942.

Maier was born into a Jewish family in Manhattan, the son of Julius Maier and Lydia B. Maier. All four of his grandparents emigrated from Germany. He attended Columbia Law School and was an editor on the  Columbia Law Review.

He died at age 33 after suffering from an illness for two months. Maier was inducted into the ACBL Hall of Fame in 2004.

Bridge accomplishments

Honors

 ACBL Hall of Fame, 2004

Wins

 North American Bridge Championships (9)
 Masters Individual (1) 1939 
 von Zedtwitz Life Master Pairs (1) 1941 
 Wernher Open Pairs (1) 1940 
 Vanderbilt (2) 1937, 1938 
 Spingold (2) 1935, 1937 
 Spingold (2) 1938, 1939

Runners-up

 North American Bridge Championships
 Masters Individual (1) 1936 
 Vanderbilt (2) 1935, 1941 
 Masters Team of 4 (1) 1936 
 Reisinger (2) 1934, 1939 
 Spingold (1) 1941

See also
 Four Aces

References

External links
 

1908 births
1942 deaths
American contract bridge players
20th-century American Jews
Columbia Law School alumni
Lawyers from New York City
American people of German-Jewish descent
20th-century American lawyers